The 2005–06 WHL season was the 40th season for the Western Hockey League. Twenty teams completed a 72-game schedule. The Vancouver Giants won the President's Cup.

League notes
The WHL announced that it would adopt many of the new rules put in place by the NHL this season to increase scoring.  They are:
Shootouts: Ties no longer count in the standings, and are replaced with the shootout. Shootout losses will count as one point in the standings.
Tighter standard of officiating, especially as it relates to obstruction fouls.
Goaltender restriction zone or the "trapezoid", will be employed. Goaltenders will be forbidden from playing the puck in the corners behind the goal line.  A violation will merit a two-minute delay of game penalty.
Tag-up Offside rule will be used.
The centre ice red line will no longer be considered for the purpose of determining an offside (two-line) pass.
Any player who shoots the puck over the glass and out of play from their defensive zone will receive a delay of game penalty.
Any team called for icing the puck from within their defensive zone will not be permitted a line change.  Unlike the NHL, any team that ices the puck from their half of the neutral zone will be permitted to change.

It is worth noting that the WHL did not move the goal and blue lines to increase the size of the offensive zones like the NHL, as the league felt that the teams did not have enough time to modify their arenas.  Thus, only the Calgary Hitmen, who share an arena with the Calgary Flames play using the new alignment.  The new standard will be employed by the remaining teams beginning in 2006–07.

Internet Broadcasts 
On September 14, 2005, Commissioner Ron Robison announced the league's intention to broadcast the entire 2005-2006 Season and 2006 WHL playoff games via the internet live on a pay-per-view (PPV) broadband basis.  Partnering with streaming media company, INSINC, this marked the first time in WHL history that fans, media and scouts were able to watch WHL action online.

Regular season

Final standings

Eastern Conference

Western Conference

Scoring leaders
Note: GP = Games played; G = Goals; A = Assists; Pts = Points; PIM = Penalties in minutes

Goaltending leaders
Note: GP = Games played; Min = Minutes played; W = Wins; L = Losses; SOL = Shootout losses ; GA = Goals against; SO = Total shutouts; SV% = Save percentage; GAA = Goals against average

2006 WHL Playoffs

Overview

Conference quarterfinals

Eastern Conference

Western Conference

Conference semifinals

Conference finals

WHL Championship

ADT Canada-Russia Challenge

On November 30, Team WHL defeated the Russian Selects 9–2 in Saskatoon, Saskatchewan before a crowd of 5,572.

On December 1, Team WHL defeated the Russian Selects 3–1 in Regina, Saskatchewan before a crowd of 4,662.

The WHL has an all-time record of 6–0 against the Russian Selects since the tournament began in 2003–04.

WHL awards

All-Star Teams

source: Western Hockey League press release

2006 Bantam draft
The 2006 WHL Bantam Draft took place in Calgary, Alberta on Thursday May 4. It was the 17th annual draft to take place.

List of first round picks in the bantam draft.

See also
2005–06 OHL season
2005–06 QMJHL season
2006 Memorial Cup
2006 NHL Entry Draft
2005 in ice hockey
2006 in ice hockey

References

whl.ca

WHL
Western Hockey League seasons
WHL